Andrej Klimovets (born August 18, 1974, in Gomel, Belarusian SSR, Soviet Union) is a former Belarusian and from 2005 German team handball player. He is World champion from 2007 with the German national team. He participated on the German team that finished 4th at the 2008 European Men's Handball Championship.

He competed for Germany in handball at the 2008 Summer Olympics.

Belarusian career
Andrej Klimovets played 112 matches for the Belarusian national team.

References

External links 
 
 
 

1974 births
Living people
Belarusian male handball players
German male handball players
Naturalized citizens of Germany
German people of Belarusian descent
Olympic handball players of Germany
Handball players at the 2008 Summer Olympics
HSG Wetzlar players
Sportspeople from Gomel